— François Villon, the "Ballade des Dams du Temps Jadis" in Le Grand Testament, 1461

Nationality words link to articles with information on the nation's poetry or literature (for instance, Irish or France).

Events
1462: 10 September – Robert Henryson in Scotland is enrolled as a teacher in the recently founded University of Glasgow.
1463: January – French poet François Villon is reprieved from hanging but never heard of again.

Works published
1461:
 François Villon, Le Grand Testament, lyric poem; France consisting of 173 stanzas containing many ballads, or rondeaux, including "Ballade des dames du Temps Jadis" (see quotation, above)

1463:
 Matteo Maria Boiardo, Carmina de Laudibus Estensium, Italy

1468:
 Jami, Haft Owrang ("Seven Thrones"), collection of seven idylls (masnavi); Afghanistan poet who wrote in Persian

Births
Death years link to the corresponding "[year] in poetry" article:

1460:
 Cornelio Paolo Amalteo born about this year (died 1517), Italian, Latin-language poet
 Alessandro Cortesi (died 1490), Italian, Latin-language poet
 William Dunbar, born about this year (died c. 1520), Scottish
 Robert Henryson, year uncertain, Scottish  poet who flourished from this year until 1500
 Gwerful Mechain born about this year (died 1502), Welsh erotic poet, a woman
 John Skelton (died 1529), English

1461:
 February 6 – Džore Držić (died 1501), Croatian poet and playwright

1462:
 Robert Henryson, Scottish  poet who flourished from about this year until roughly 1500
 John Skelton born about this year (died c. 1529), English
 Fausto Andrelino born about this year (died c. 1517), Italian, Latin-language poet
 Lope de Vega (died 1535), Spain

1463:
 C. Aurelio Cambini (died sometime after 1494), Italian, Latin-language poet
 Giovanni Pico della Mirandola (died 1494), Italian, Latin-language poet
 Antonio Tebaldeo (died 1537), Italian poet who wrote in both Italian and Latin

1464:
 Giannantonio Flaminio (died 1536), Italian, Latin-language poet
 
1465:
 September 11 – Bernardo Accolti (died 1536), Italian
 Girolamo Carbone born about this year (died sometime after 1527), Italian, Latin-language poet
 Serafino Ciminelli, also known as "Serafino Aquilano" (died 1500), Italian poet, singer, author and actor
 Cassandra Fedele, born about this year (died 1558), Italian, Latin-language poet
 Biernat of Lublin Polish: "Biernat z Lublina", born about this year (died sometime after 1529), Polish
 Gil Vicente born about this year (died c. 1536), Portuguese poet and playwright
 Yamazaki Sōkan (died 1553), Japanese renga and haikai poet

1467:
 Girolamo Amaseo (died 1517), Italian, Latin-language poet
 Octavien de Saint-Gelais (died 1502), French churchman, poet and translator

1468:
 July 12 – Juan del Encina (sources differ on his death year, with one giving late 1529 or early 1530 and others 1533; or 1534), Spanish poet, musician and playwright
 Octavien de Saint-Gelais (died 1502), French churchman, poet and translator

1469:
 Giacomo Bon (died 1538), Italian, Latin-language poet
 Niccolò Machiavelli (died 1527), Italian philosopher, writer, poet, musician, and politician
 Francesco Di Natale (died 1542), Italian, Latin-language poet
 Giovanni Francesco Pico (died 1533), Italian, Latin-language poet

Deaths
Birth years link to the corresponding "[year] in poetry" article:

1461:
Martin le Franc (born 1410), French poet of the late Middle Ages and early Renaissance
 Krittibas Ojha (born 1381), medieval Bengali poet

1462:
 Azari Tusi (born 1380), Persian poet

1463:
 March 6 – Saint Catherine of Bologna (born 1413), Italian saint, abbess, visionary, calligrapher, miniaturist and poet
 François Villon died sometime after January 5 (born c. 1431), French poet, thief and vagabond

1465:
 January 5 – Charles, duc d'Orléans (born 1394), French
 Pierre Michault (born 1405)
 
1469:
 Ubertino Pusculo died about this year (born 1431), Italian, Latin-language poet

See also

 Poetry
 15th century in poetry
 15th century in literature

Notes

15th-century poetry
Poetry